Moment in the Sun may refer to:

 "Moment in the Sun" (The Living End song), 2008
 Moment in the Sun (EP), an EP by Clem Snide, or the title track